Basanti Devi College is the first government sponsored Girls college in Kolkata and was founded by the Government of West Bengal in 1959 with the mission of empowerment of women. Named after the eminent freedom fighter Basanti Devi, the first lady to be imprisoned under British Rule for being involved in the war of Independence of India. It is affiliated with the University of Calcutta.

The College 
Located at the junction of the urban and rural conglomerate, this premier college caters to the needs of girl students from both these areas. A large group of them are also from backward classes, minority communities and from below poverty line. The college offers scope for higher education for women with special needs.

Along with the Calcutta University stipulated academic curriculum, the college also offers scope for the empowerment of girl students by helping them to develop their self-help skills, self-reliance and independence. The College offers B.A. (Hons/Major/General), B.Sc (Hons/General) and M.A. in English (Self Financed) & M.A. in Political Science (Self Financed) under the University of Calcutta.

The College also has a Study Center under Netaji Subhas Open University (Center Code : A-02) which runs on Saturdays & Sundays Only.

Notable alumni
Lopamudra Mitra, singer
Tanusree Chakraborty, actress
Rooqma Ray, actress

See also

References

External links
 Basanti Devi College / Kolkata /Calcutta 

Universities and colleges in Kolkata
Women's universities and colleges in West Bengal
Educational institutions established in 1959
1959 establishments in West Bengal